The Grand Nile Tower Hotel is located on Roda Island in Cairo, Egypt.

History and profile
The 966-room original wing of the hotel opened in 1974 as Le Meridien Cairo. In 2001, the $380 million, 715-room, 41-floor Nile Tower wing, with a revolving restaurant and a shopping mall, was added, and the hotel was relaunched in August 2001 as Le Royal Méridien Cairo & Nile Tower. The hotel's owners, the Saudi Egyptian Touristic Development Company (SETDC), severed Le Méridien's management contract on 8 August 2002, closed the 1974 wing, and operated the newer wing of the hotel independently as the Royal Nile Tower for a year, until Hyatt International assumed management of the property on 1 August 2003, and the tower wing was renamed Grand Hyatt Cairo. Plans were announced to convert the closed 1974 wing into the 245-room Park Hyatt Cairo, following a $20 million renovation, but the project never came to fruition and the building remains closed as of 2022. All foreign national Hyatt management and staff were evacuated in February 2011, as a result of the Egyptian revolution of 2011. This action was followed by strikes by the hotel's remaining Egyptian staff, which caused Hyatt to completely sever its connection with the hotel on 20 March 2011. SETDC was locked in legal disputes with Hyatt for four months, and the hotel continued to use the Hyatt name until 1 June 2011, when the owners officially changed the name to Grand Nile Tower. It was announced in 2017 that the hotel would be renamed the "Hilton Nile Tower" in 2018, but the name change never took place.

Gallery

References

1974 establishments in Egypt
Hotels established in 1974
Hotel buildings completed in 1974
Hotel buildings completed in 2001
Hotels in Cairo
Buildings and structures with revolving restaurants
Skyscrapers in Egypt
Skyscraper hotels
21st-century architecture in Egypt